André H.P. Cools (1 August 1927 – 18 July 1991) was a Belgian politician and a senior figure within the Walloon Socialist Party (PS) in the Liège region. He was assassinated in 1991 and the subsequent investigation uncovered widespread graft within Belgium's two socialist parties.

Political career
Cools had a long and distinguished political career. He was the Belgian budget minister from 1968 to 1971, Deputy Prime Minister from 1969 to 1972, head of the Walloon section of the Belgian Parti Socialiste (PS) from 1973 to 1978, chairman of the national party from 1978 to 1981, president of the Walloon Council from 1982 to 1985, and minister of the government of the Walloon Region from 1988 to 1990. He was also given the honorific title of Minister of State in 1983. In 1990 he retired from the national political scene after an internal power struggle within the PS but he remained influential in the local party in Liège.

Cools was noted for his pithy pronouncements. For example, when in 1984 he commented on who he thought the four greatest United States presidents had been, he said: 'Roosevelt, Roosevelt, Roosevelt and Roosevelt'.

His nickname was "Le maître de Flémalle" ("Master of Flémalle").

Assassination and aftermath

He was shot dead in Liège in 1991.

While the police were investigating the assassination, several scandals involving André Cools became public (like the Agusta-affair).

In January 2004, Taxquet and di Mauro were sentenced to twenty years' imprisonment.

See also
Belgian general strike of 1960–1961
Belgian political scandals
Parliamentary inquiries by the Belgian Federal Parliament

References

Works cited

Sources

André Cools 

1927 births
1991 deaths
Assassinated Belgian politicians
Belgian Ministers of State
Belgian Socialist Party politicians
Deaths by firearm in Belgium
Socialist Party (Belgium) politicians
People from Flémalle
People murdered in Belgium
Walloon movement activists
Walloon people of Flemish descent